Rachna Banerjee (born Jhumjhum Rakesh Banerjee; 2 October 1974) also known as Rachana, is an Indian actress, entrepreneur and  television presenter. She is known for her works in Bengali and Odia film industries and has also appeared in several Telugu, Tamil and Kannada films. Being crowned the 1994 Miss Kolkata, she has also won five beauty contests in India including Miss Beautiful Smile at the Miss India contest.

Early life
Banerjee was born in Kolkata, West Bengal, India, and was her parents' only child. Her father was Upamanyu Banerjee.  Her original name was Jhumjhum Banerjee, and was changed to Rachana by Sukhen Das, the director of her debut film Daan Pratidaan (1993).

Career 
Banerjee won the Miss Kolkata contest in 1994 when she was still in her second year of graduation course from South City College. She entered several beauty pageants before starting her acting career and was often declared 'Miss Beautiful Smile'. In 1994 she missed out of the Miss India contest grand finale where Madhu Sapre was crowned the title. Banerjee's breakthrough role was with director Sukhen Das who changed her name to Rachana (which Das found in 'Rabindra Rachanabali').. Her biggest success in film career comes when she played the female lead opposite Siddhant Mahapatra in about 40 movies.she appeared against Amitabh Bachchan in the movie Sooryavansham one of the cult movies of its era. She has appeared  in 35 Bengali films with her favorite actor Prosenjit Chatterjee.

Hosting Didi No. 1 

Apart from acting, Banerjee is also hosting the popular Bengali 
non-fiction TV show, Didi No. 1, which is aired on Zee Bangla on weekdays. On 5 April 2013 a fire broke out in the studio of Didi No. 1 at Tollygunge, and she fainted following a panic attack and was rushed to a city hospital (Aurobindo Seva Sadan) immediately.

Personal life
Rachna Banerjee married Probal Basu in 2007. They have a son.

Filmography

List of reality shows

Awards
 Kalakar Awards, Bharat Nirman Award, Odia State Film Award, Special Film Award by West Bengal State Govt, Tele Samman Award, ETV Bangla Film Award, Zee Bangla Sonar Songsar Award 2015 for Didi No. 1 & Tumi Je Amar
Odisha State Film Award (Special Jury) – Suna Harini (1999) 
Odisha State Film Award for Best Actress – Mo Kola To Jhulana (2001)

References

External links
 
 

Living people
Actresses in Bengali cinema
Actresses in Odia cinema
Actresses in Tamil cinema
Actresses in Kannada cinema
Indian film actresses
Actresses from Kolkata
Kalakar Awards winners
20th-century Indian actresses
21st-century Indian actresses
Actresses in Telugu cinema
1974 births